Oliva tricolor, common name the tricolour olive, is a species of sea snail, a marine gastropod mollusk in the family Olividae, the olives.

Subspecies
 Oliva tricolor abbasi (Thach & Berschauer, 2016) (synonym: Viduoliva tricolor abbasi Thach & Berschauer, 2016)
 Oliva tricolor tricolor Lamarck, 1811
 Oliva tricolor palawanensis Bartsch, 1918 (taxon inquirendum)

Description
The length of the shell is between 38 mm and 63 mm.

Distribution
Oliva tricolor is endemic to the Indian Ocean, the West Pacific and the South China Sea.

References

 Liu, J.Y. [Ruiyu] (ed.). (2008). Checklist of marine biota of China seas. China Science Press. 1267 pp

External links
 Lamarck (J.B.M.de). (1811). Suite de la détermination des espèces de Mollusques testacés. Annales du Muséum National d'Histoire Naturelle. 16: 300-328
 Duclos, P. L. (1835-1840). Histoire naturelle générale et particulière de tous les genres de coquilles univalves marines a l'état vivant et fossile publiée par monographie. Genre Olive. Paris: Institut de France. 33 plates: pls 1-12
 

tricolor
Gastropods described in 1811